The Stammheim Missal (made between 1160 and 1170) is an illuminated manuscript Roman missal now in the J. Paul Getty Museum, acquired from the barons of Fürstenberg's private collection; they sold it to raise funds to repair Schloss Körtlinghausen. A Carolingian ivory diptych had been used on or for its binding, but was removed in 1904 and was in the State Museums of Berlin until 1945, when it disappeared after the museum was bombed.

It was produced by Henricus of Middel, a priest, for Hildesheim Abbey, and was later held at Stammheim Castle. It was made in the same era as the Ratmann Sacramentary. It is richly decorated with full-page miniatures, including one showing Bernward of Hildesheim (died 1022, subject of a local cult from 1150 and formally canonised in 1192).

References 
12th-century illuminated manuscripts
Illuminated manuscripts of the J. Paul Getty Museum
Missals
1160s books

 Teviotdale, Elizabeth C. The Stammheim Missal. Getty Museum Studies on Art (Los Angeles: J. Paul Getty Museum, 2001)
 Teviotdale, Elizabeth C. "The Pictorial Program of the Stammheim Missal." In Objects, Images, and the Word: Art in the Service of the Liturgy. Colum Hourihane, ed. (Princeton: Princeton University Press, 2003), pp. 79–93, ill.
 Mellinkoff, Ruth. Averting Demons: The Protective Power of Medieval Visual Motifs and Themes. 2 vols. (Los Angeles: Ruth Mellinkoff Publications, 2004), vol. 1 (2004), vol. 1, pp. 61, 64, 115, 119, 127–128, 164; vol. 2, figs. I.2, I.18, V.1, V.27, VI.2.
 Bradley, Jill. 'You shall surely not die': The Concepts of Sin and Death as Expressed in the Manuscript Art of Northwestern Europe, c. 800-1200. 2 vols.
 Kren, Thomas. Illuminated Manuscripts of Germany and Central Europe in the J. Paul Getty Museum (Los Angeles: J. Paul Getty Museum, 2009), pp. 17–20, 32, 54–63, frontispiece, ill.
 Nishimura, Margot McIlwain. Images in the Margins (Los Angeles: J. Paul Getty Museum; London: The British Library, 2009), pp. 5, 8–9, 11, fig. 5, ill.
 Briggs, Sarah. "Closer to Eve: Touch and Typology in the Genesis Illumination of the Stammheim Missal." Bowdoin Journal of Art (2015), pp. 1 -21.
 Elizabeth C. Teviotdale, Gerhard Lutz, Christina Sciacca, Nancy K. Turner, Kristen Collins: The Stammheim Missal. Ms. 64, The J. Paul Getty Museum. Commentary to the Facsimile Edition. Luzern: Quaternio Verlag Luzern 2020.